The 1991 Hi-Tec British Open Championships was held at the Lambs Squash Club with the later stages being held at the Wembley Conference Centre from 12–22 April 1991. Jahangir Khan won his tenth consecutive title defeating Jansher Khan in the final. Jahangir was only seeded fourth because he had previously taken time off from competition through illness and exhaustion.Jamie Hickcox and Austin Adarraga now represented Canada and Australia respectively.

Seeds

Draw and results

First round

Main draw

References

Men's British Open Squash Championships
Men's British Open
Men's British Open Squash Championship
Men's British Open Squash Championship
Men's British Open Squash Championship
Squash competitions in London